is a type of Japanese pottery traditionally from Yatsushiro, Kumamoto prefecture.

Most of the decorative style is influenced by Goryeo ware.

The Hirayama Kiln Site (平山窯跡) is inscribed in the list of Historic Sites of Japan (Kumamoto).

External links 

 http://www.pref.kumamoto.jp/kennan/kiji_7517.html

Japanese pottery
Culture in Kumamoto Prefecture